Samuel Winslow was an American politician.

Samuel Winslow may also refer to:

Samuel Winslow (patentee)
Samuel Winslow (mayor)